Tsuyohito Iwamoto (born October 19, 1964, in Hokkaido Prefecture, Japan) is a Japanese politician who has served as a member of the House of Councillors of Japan since 2019. He represents the Hokkaido at-large district and is a member of the Liberal Democratic Party.

He is a member of the following committees (as of 2021):

 Committee on Land and Transport
 Committee on Rules and Administration
 Special Committee on Okinawa and Northern Problems
 Special Committee on Political Ethics and Election System (Director)

References 

Members of the House of Councillors (Japan)
People from Hokkaido
1964 births
Living people